The Cosmic Radiation Satellite (CORSA) was a Japanese space telescope. It was supposed to be Japan's first X-ray astronomy satellite but was lost due to failure of its Mu-3 launch vehicle. A replacement satellite Hakucho (CORSA-b) was later launched.

Sources

Space telescopes